Otto Alexis Schade López (also known as "Osch") is a Chilean artist and architect based in London, United Kingdom, since 2006.

Biography
At young age he studied at St. John's School in Concepcion and Sagrados Corazones de Talcahuano.

After receiving his higher education at the University of the Bío Bío where he studied Construction and Design Architecture in his native country, he worked on his own projects as an architect in Chile with colleagues Carlos Belmar and Pedro Caparros from 2000 till 2004. In Europe he worked for architecture design companies such as Benoy, Civicart and Zaha Hadids. He also gave lectures on Design at the Southbank University from 2008 till 2013. 
 
After practicing architecture for more than a decade, Schade dedicated himself to creative skills, particularly to painting. As an artist he has exhibited his work in Chile, Russia, Sweden, France, Nederlands, United States, Hong Kong, Japan and Germany.
 
Schade's work includes abstract, surreal and pop art. In 2009 he started painting on the streets mainly in the UK urban center of Shoreditch (London) using the pseudonym "Osch". Schade came up with a quick and effective way to deliver his messages using simple 1 or 2 layer stencils, culminating in his instantly recognisable trademark Orbs.
 
By using his more established and sophisticated stenciling techniques Osch continues to evolve his distinctive ribbon style, which he uses in part to criticize and ironically depict some of the world's current social issues. Many of his works hold satirical messages in order to raise social awareness and reach the boundaries of human vision. This political and social commentary is often present in his practice as an urban artist and has been an inherent feature of his works, which increasingly appear as street art around the world.
 
Osch has painted at many art festivals such as the biggest street art festival in Europe, "Upfest" Bristol, "Sand, Sea and Spray" Blackpool, "City of Colors" Birmingham, "Wynwood" Miami US, "Sunscape" Malta, as well as "Stick Together" and "Urban Art Festival" both in Amsterdam.

References

Chilean painters
Chilean architects
Chilean surrealist artists
1971 births
People from Concepción, Chile
Living people
Chilean people of German descent
English people of German descent
British people of German descent
English people of Chilean descent
British people of Chilean descent
Chilean emigrants to England